In mathematics,  surfaces of class VII  are non-algebraic complex surfaces studied by  that have Kodaira dimension −∞ and first Betti number 1. Minimal surfaces of class VII (those with
no rational curves with self-intersection −1) are called surfaces of class VII0. Every class VII surface is birational to a unique minimal class VII surface, and can be obtained from this minimal surface by blowing up points a finite number of times.

The  name "class VII" comes from 
, which  divided minimal surfaces into 7 classes numbered I0 to VII0. 
However Kodaira's class VII0 did not have the condition that the Kodaira dimension is −∞, but instead had the condition that the geometric genus is 0. As a result, his class VII0 also included some other surfaces, such as secondary Kodaira surfaces, that are no longer considered to be class VII as they do not have Kodaira dimension −∞.

Invariants
The irregularity q is 1, and  h1,0 = 0. All plurigenera are 0.

Hodge diamond:

Examples
Hopf surfaces are quotients of C2−(0,0) by a discrete group G acting freely, and have vanishing second Betti numbers. The simplest example is to take G to be the integers, acting as multiplication by powers of 2; the corresponding Hopf surface is diffeomorphic to S1×S3.

Inoue surfaces are certain class VII surfaces whose universal cover is C×H where H is the upper half plane (so they are quotients of this by a group of automorphisms). They  have vanishing second Betti numbers.

Inoue–Hirzebruch surfaces, Enoki surfaces, and Kato surfaces give examples of type VII surfaces with b2 > 0.

Classification and global spherical shells

A global spherical shell  is a smooth 3-sphere in the surface with connected complement, with a neighbourhood biholomorphic to a neighbourhood of a sphere in C2. The global spherical shell conjecture claims that all class VII0 surfaces with positive second Betti number have a global spherical shell. The manifolds with a global spherical shell are all Kato surfaces which are reasonably well understood, so a proof of this conjecture would lead to a classification of the type VII surfaces.

A class VII surface with positive second Betti number b2 has at most b2 rational curves, and has exactly this number if it has a global spherical shell. Conversely
 showed that if a minimal class VII surface with positive second Betti number b2 has exactly b2 rational curves then it has a global spherical shell.

For type VII surfaces with vanishing second Betti number, the primary Hopf surfaces have a global spherical shell, but secondary Hopf surfaces and Inoue surfaces do not because their fundamental groups are not infinite cyclic. Blowing up points on the latter surfaces gives non-minimal class VII surfaces with positive second Betti number that do not have spherical shells.

References

 

Complex surfaces